Haddock's Hall is a historic commercial building located at Piermont in Rockland County, New York.  It was built about 1875 and is a two-story, three bay wide, brick commercial / civic building.  It features a three-story tower.  It was originally constructed for use as a store, warehouse, and village hall.

It was listed on the National Register of Historic Places in 1991.

References

Commercial buildings on the National Register of Historic Places in New York (state)
Commercial buildings completed in 1875
Buildings and structures in Rockland County, New York
Government buildings completed in 1875
City and town halls on the National Register of Historic Places in New York (state)
National Register of Historic Places in Rockland County, New York
1875 establishments in New York (state)